Plasteroïd is the third studio album by the electronic band Rockets. It was released in 1979 on Rockland Records.

Track listing

Personnel
Rockets
Christian Le Bartz – vocals
"Little" Gerard L'Her – bass, vocals
Alain Maratrat – guitar, keyboards, vocals on "Atlantis Town"
Fabrice Quagliotti – keyboards
Alain Groetzinger – drums, percussion
Additional personnel
Claude Lemoine – production
Claude Achalle – engineering
Henri Arcens – engineering
Jean-Jacques Mahuteau – artwork
Renaud Marchand – artwork
Gunther – photography
Joël Savy – lacquering

Release history

Certifications

References

1979 albums
Rockets (band) albums